West Kilimanjaro, or West Chaga, is a Bantu language of Tanzania spoken by the Chaga people.

There are several dialects:
 Rwa (Rwo, Meru, Kirwo), or Meru, from Mount Meru
 Mashami (Kimashame), or "Hai" (Kihai)
 Siha
 Kiwoso (Kibosho including Kindi, Kombo, Mweka)
 Masama
 Ng’uni

References

Languages of Tanzania
Chaga languages